Nopcsaspondylus (meaning "Nopcsa's vertebra", in reference to the original describer) is a genus of rebbachisaurid sauropod dinosaur (a type of large, long-necked quadrupedal herbivorous dinosaur) from the Cenomanian-age (Upper Cretaceous) Candeleros Formation of Neuquén, Argentina. It is based on a now-lost back vertebra described by Nopcsa in 1902 but not named at the time. The specimen had a small vertebral body and large hollows, now known to be typical of rebbachisaurids.

References 

Rebbachisaurids
Late Cretaceous dinosaurs of South America
Cenomanian life
Cretaceous Argentina
Fossils of Argentina
Candeleros Formation
Fossil taxa described in 2007